Education Opens Doors (EOD) is a nonprofit organization based in Dallas, Texas, whose stated mission is to “empower students to purposefully navigate through high school to college.” The organization collaborates with area schools and utilizes a college knowledge program, called Roadmap to Success, to increase students’ college expectations and attainability. In the four years since EOD's founding, the organization has implemented its program for over 15,000 students in the Dallas area.

References

Educational charities based in the United States
Charities based in Texas